Independence war may refer to:

 War of independence
 I-War (Independence War), a 1997 space combat simulator